The Ranni Forest Division in Kerala, India, was constituted on 7 July 1958, comprising the Ranni, Vadasserikkara, and Goodrical ranges, with its headquarters at Ranni. It covers the parts of Konni reserve forest and the reserves of Ranni, Goodrical, Rajampara, Karimkulam, Kumaramperoor, Valiyakavu, and Schettakkal.

Types of forests and composition 

Reserve forests covering  and vested forests covering  are the major types of forests in this division. The Ranni Forest Division, with its natural beauty and richness in flora and fauna, is a storehouse of many varieties of plants and animals. The forests in the Ranni range can be classified into the following categories.
West coast tropical evergreen forests
West coast semi-evergreen forests
Southern moist mixed deciduous forests
Southern sub tropical wet hill forests
Southern montane wet temperate forests
Reed breakes
Grass lands
Manmade forests

Divisions of Ranni forest

Goodrical range
Comparatively, human interference is less in these forests than in others in India. But at times of the Sabarimala pilgrimage, these forests ranges are crowded with devotees. Evergreen and semi-evergreen types of forests are here. There are three forest stations under this range:
Plappally
Kochukoikkal
Pachakkanam

Vadasserikkara range
The Vadasserikkara range lies to the eastern part of Ranni, with its headquarters at Vadasserikkara. This range covers an area of almost  of the Ranni Forest Division. Kakkattar and Kallar, tributaries of the Pamba River, flow through this range. Small-scale agriculture is done in the populated regions of the Vadasserikkara range, especially on the gentle slopes. The natural forests of this range are classified into west coast tropical evergreen forests, west coast semi-evergreen forests, southern moist mixed deciduous forests, and grasslands. There are three forest stations under Vadasserikkara:
Chittar
Gurunathanmannu
Thannithodu

Ranni range

Evergreen, semi-evergreen, and deciduous types of forests can be seen here. The three forest stations under this range are:
Karikulam
Kanamala
Rajampara

Index of flora and fauna

Flora

Many unique plants and herbs can be seen in these forest ranges. Medical plants such as Shatavari (Asparagus racemosus), Solanum anguivi, Desmodium gangeticum, Cissus quadrangularis, Pseudarthria viscida, Strobilanthes ciliatus,  and Dysoxylum malabaricum (Vella akil) grow in the deeper parts of the forest. The eco-system of the forests here is suitable for the growth of these plants. A complete list of plants seen in Ranni division is given below.

Fauna

Fishes and amphibians

The natural streams and rivers in these ranges are the repository of varied fish species and amphibians. Almost 51species of fishes and 43species of amphibians were reported from the various streams and water bodies in the forest divisions of Ranni. They are the following.

For more details

Reptiles and mammals
Kerala's forests are the storehouse of many species of reptiles and mammals. Reptiles of 59species and mammals of 34species were reported from the forests of Ranni. The rain forests here are the habitat of the venomous King cobra. Many King cobras were caught by Vava Suresh, the snake expert and wildlife conservationist for the Angamoozhy, Chittar, and Moozhiyar regions in the Goodrical range. The mammals are also rich in number, with countless species in these forests.

Birds
There are abundant species of birds in these forests, including some that face extinction. There are 196 known species of birds reported from the Ranni division.

List of birds

Tribal settlements 
The forest ranges of Ranni are inhabited by many tribal communities, mainly the Ulladan, Vettuvan and Malavedan, each having their own traditions and beliefs.

See also 
 Department of Forests and Wildlife (Kerala)
 Ranni
 Vadasserikkara

References

External links 

 Official website of Kerala forest department
 Ranni division-Kerala forest department
Noah's Gopher trees VIPs of Ranni forest in Pathanamthitta

Forestry
Protected areas of Kerala
1958 establishments in Kerala
Protected areas established in 1958
Geography of Pathanamthitta district
Tourist attractions in Pathanamthitta district